The Crocodile Hunter: Collision Course is a 2002 adventure comedy film based on the nature documentary television series The Crocodile Hunter. It stars Steve Irwin and his wife Terri Irwin and was directed by frequent Irwin collaborator John Stainton. The film was released in between the fourth and fifth seasons of the series. Collision Course follows Steve and Terri who attempt to save a crocodile from "poachers" not knowing that the two men are actually American Central Intelligence Agency (CIA) agents who are after them because the crocodile in the Irwins' possession has accidentally swallowed an important satellite tracking beacon.

The film was theatrically released on July 12, 2002 in the U.S. by Metro-Goldwyn-Mayer, which used a crocodile in place of the usual Leo the Lion for its title credit logo sequence. The film earned $33.4 million on a $12 million budget.

Plot
In outer space, a United States-owned satellite blows up and one of the last remaining pieces, a beacon, is sent hurdling towards Earth where it lands in Australia, only to be swallowed by a crocodile. Back at the CIA, Agent Buckwhiler and Deputy Director Reynolds reveal that, in the wrong hands, the beacon can change the axis of power in the world, so they send two agents, Robert Wheeler and Vaughn Archer, down to Australia to retrieve the beacon. Department Director Ansell also secretly hires an operative of his own, Jo Buckley, to go and retrieve the beacon before Wheeler and Archer, so Ansell can take Reynolds' job.

In Australia, the beast that swallowed the beacon lives in a river next to the house of Brozzie Drewitt, an obnoxious cattle station owner who is taking it in her own hands to kill the beast for preying on her cattle. Because of this, the Department of Fauna and Fisheries send one of its workers, Sam Flynn, to Drewitt's house. Sam attempts to convince Brozzie to hire some professionals to relocate the animal, instead of having her kill it, which is illegal. Despite Flynn's words, Brozzie attempts to kill the beast later that night, only to fail.

Meanwhile, the Crocodile Hunter Steve Irwin and his wife Terri are filming an episode of their TV show when they are hired by Flynn to relocate the beast that has been bothering Brozzie. After some difficulty, Steve manages to catch the beast and successfully gets it in his boat. Wheeler and Archer are nearby using GPS technology to track the beacon. When the two agents see Steve and Terri zoom past them in their boat with the beast who swallowed the beacon on board, they are convinced that the Irwins have the beacon. They call up the CIA, who believe the Irwins plan to use the beacon to pay for a multimillion-dollar expansion to Australia Zoo. Steve and Terri board up the beast in a crate and put it in the back of the truck to drive to a new river system. Wheeler and Archer follow them from behind in a Land Rover, and when Wheeler hops on the top of the Irwins' truck, Steve believes them to be poachers who are after the beast. Steve climbs up on the roof and, after a brief fistfight, manages to knock Wheeler off the truck.

When the Irwins reach the river, Steve opens the beast's crate and discovers that the beast had defecated. In the poop, Steve sees a shiny metal object (the beacon) which he mistakes to be an improperly discarded children's spinning top toy. Steve and Terri successfully get the beast in the Thomson River, but Wheeler and Archer show up again in a boat, determined to get the beacon. Jo Buckley shows up in an ultralight and throws sticks of dynamite down on Wheeler and Archer's boat, destroying it and knocking the two agents in the river. Steve believes that he and Terri are caught up in the middle of a "poacher war" and, not wanting the dynamite to hurt the newly relocated beast, gets a rope out of the boat and lassoes the aircraft, causing it to crash in the river, though Buckley survives. She swims to shore to inform Ansell via a phone call that she failed to retrieve the beacon. Ansell informs Buckley that he is on the run from the CIA and the police for hiring her for the mission. He is found by police and is arrested for his crimes, ending the phone call.

Due to Wheeler and Archer's failure to retrieve the beacon, the CIA decides that it is time for drastic measures and they call up American President George W. Bush in the White House to request permission to use military helicopters to fly to Australia and get the beacon. Steve is ending his show by throwing the beacon in the air, when the military helicopters arrive.

In the epilogue, Steve reveals that he returned the beacon to the CIA without hassle, but remains oblivious to its significance. Brozzie becomes a volunteer for the Department of Fauna and Fisheries, while the CIA send Wheeler and Archer to work at the zoo as volunteers. All parties involved have trouble adapting to their new environments, but Steve assures the audience that he will help them.

Cast
 Steve Irwin as Steve Irwin/The Crocodile Hunter
 Terri Irwin as Terri Irwin
 Bindi Irwin as Bindi Irwin (at the end credits as a baby.)
 Sui (Steve and Terri's Statffordshire Bull Terrier) as Sui
 Magda Szubanski as Brozzie Drewitt
 David Wenham as Sam Flynn
 Aden Young as Ron Buckwhiler
 Steve Bastoni as Deputy Director Reynolds
 Lachy Hulme as Robert Wheeler
 Kenneth Ransom as Vaughn Archer
 Steve Vidler as Department Director Ansell
 Kate Beahan as Jo Buckley
 Robert Coleby as Dr. Weinberger
 Timothy Bottoms as U.S. President George W. Bush

Production
Due to the series' immense popularity, director/producer Stainton had developed an idea for a feature-length Crocodile Hunter film in 1999 while shooting a documentary in Africa. He wanted to make a good film, but, at the same time, make it easy for Steve who was not used to acting, believing that Irwin should only play himself. It was Stainton's idea to film Steve and Terri doing a traditional nature documentary in the Australian Outback and film these scenes in a 1:85 screen ratio. In fact, nothing for the "documentary" scenes were ever scripted, and when the actors (from the scripted dramatic scenes that use a 2:40 screen ratio) entered the Irwins' world for a few brief scenes, Steve (who did not know anything about the script or plot) was informed by Stainton what was about to happen so Irwin could prepare and ad-lib as much as he wanted or needed. Cheyenne Enterprises, a film and television production company owned by  Bruce Willis and producer Arnold Rifkin showed interest in producing and helping finance the project. MGM then showed interest in distributing the film worldwide and principal photography began in November 2001, after having filmed the non-scripted documentary segments for well over a year. The Irwins came across hundreds of animals for the filming of the documentary scenes, but only a few, the kangaroo, the perentie, the bird eating spider, and two snakes made it into the film. The animals they encountered were re-written into the script by Holly Goldberg-Sloan for the dramatic scenes when Wheeler and Archer encounter the Irwins' truck.

The film is also known for its "special shoot" teaser trailer, set in the MGM logo, with Steve interacting with Leo the Lion, MGM's mascot.

Film aspect ratios
Collision Course was shot in two film aspect ratios, 1.85:1 for the scenes with Steve and Terri and 2.35:1 for the plot about the Australian farmer and the CIA and their efforts to find the tracking drone. In theaters and on DVD, the 1.85:1 image appears with pillar boxing, a format usually reserved for 1.33:1 ratio content appearing within 1.85:1 or 2.35:1 frames. On the Fullscreen versions, the windowboxing (mostly in the scenes with Steve and Terri and the finale) is not present due to the fullscreen process cropping the widescreen image to the 1.33:1 ratio, causing the windowboxing borders not to be shown, even when shown on a widescreen television if the image is stretched as per fullscreen programs usually are.

Reception

Critical reaction 
The film holds a 53% approval rating on Rotten Tomatoes, based on 88 reviews. The site's consensus states: "Aside from the unnecessary plot about a downed US spy satellite, there's not much difference between the movie and the TV show." Roger Ebert gave the film three out of four stars, stating "You see a couple of likable people journeying through the outback, encountering dangerous critters and getting too close for comfort, while lecturing us on their habits and dangers and almost being killed by them." Robert K. Elder of the Chicago Tribune said, "Irwin and his director never come up with an adequate reason why we should pay money for what we can get on television for free." Audiences polled by CinemaScore gave the film an average grade of "B+" on an A+ to F scale.

Box office 
The film made $28.4 million at the American box office, with a worldwide gross of $33.4 million, which against the production budget of $12 million, makes the film a considerable box office success.

Accolades

Home media
The Crocodile Hunter: Collision Course was released to VHS and DVD in the United States on December 17, 2002. A soundtrack album was released at a similar time. The movie's soundtrack would later appear on The Crocodile Hunter coin-operated kiddie ride, manufactured by Kiddy Rides Australia, as background audio.

See also

 The Crocodile Hunter

References

External links

 
 
 
 

2002 films
2002 action comedy films
2002 directorial debut films
2000s spy comedy films
2000s adventure comedy films
Australian action films
Australian comedy films
Self-reflexive films
Films based on television series
Cultural depictions of George W. Bush
Films about crocodilians
Fiction about government
Films about the Central Intelligence Agency
Films set in the United States
Films set in Queensland
Films shot in Australia
20th Century Fox films
Metro-Goldwyn-Mayer films
Animal Logic films
Steve Irwin
2000s English-language films